Cherokee Friends Church is a Society of Friends church in the city of Cherokee, Oklahoma.  Its original church, located at 120 S. Pennsylvania in Cherokee, was added to the National Register of Historic Places in 2004.

Because of structural problems to the original church, in 2003 the Friends Church moved to a new building at 61177 Grant Road in Cherokee.

The church grew from about 75 members in 1902 to almost 300 members by 1919.  Its historic building, built during 1919-20 by contractor Edward Smith, is a two-story, red brick Craftsman-style building.

The historic church's is "unique in its design among churches in the greater Cherokee area. It utilizes a style influenced heavily by the Craftsman movement espoused by Gustaf Stickley and found most often in residential architecture. Other churches in the area, contemporaneous with the Friends Church, conform to the more traditional Gothic or Classical Revival styles. The Craftsman ethos dovetails well with the philosophy of the Quakers. Stickley states, when describing the Craftsmai
Ideal in homebuilding, that he plans '...houses that are based on the big fundamental principals of honesty, simplicity,
and usefulness.. .' The Cherokee Friends Church adheres to this principal in that its very form is honest, its decor is
simple, its layout is useful."

References

External links

Cherokee Friends Church, Facebook page

Churches in Oklahoma
Churches on the National Register of Historic Places in Oklahoma
Churches completed in 1919
Buildings and structures in Alfalfa County, Oklahoma
National Register of Historic Places in Alfalfa County, Oklahoma